Marina Alta ("Upper Marina") is a central and coastal comarca of the autonomous community of Valencia, Spain. The comarca is located in the area of Alicante and its capital and largest settlement is the city of Dénia.

Marina Alta borders the comarca of Safor to the north, the Mediterranean Sea to the north and east, the comarca of Marina Baixa to the south and Comtat to the west.

Marina Alta and Marina Baixa are commonly referred to as les Marines.

Coastal towns such as Calp, Denia and Xabia rely heavily on tourism, while inland towns are more dependent on agriculture and other general commerce.

Municipalities 

The comarca of la Marina Alta comprises 33 municipalities, of which the most northeasterly two - Dénia and adjacent Xàbia (Jávea) - form the largest urban area. These are listed below with their areas and populations:

References

 
Comarques of the Valencian Community
Geography of the Province of Alicante